John Lawrence Smith (December 17, 1818 – October 12, 1883) was an American chemist and mineralogist.

He published extensively on analytical chemistry and mineralogy, including Mineralogy and Chemistry, Original Researches (1873; enlarged with biographical sketches, 1884).  His collection of meteorites was the finest in the United States, and upon his death, he passed it to Harvard. 
The J. Lawrence Smith Medal is named in his honor.

Education
J. Lawrence Smith was reportedly born either near Charleston, South Carolina, or in Louisville, Kentucky.
He was educated at the University of Virginia, he entered the Medical College of South Carolina, receiving a  medical  degree  in  1840. His graduation thesis was an essay on the "Compound   Nature of Nitrogen."

He then went to Europe to continue his studies. In Paris he studied widely, taking classes in chemistry,  toxicology,  physics, mineralogy  and  geology.  His teachers there included Théophile-Jules Pelouze. After meeting Justus von Liebig in Giessen, Germany, he spent his summers studying in Giessen and his winters studying in Paris.

Career
By 1843, he had returned to the United States.
In 1844 he began the practice of medicine at Charleston.  In 1846, he helped to establish the Medical and Surgical Journal of South Carolina. 
His tastes, however, clearly tended more towards chemical analysis than towards medicine. He  spent much of his time improving methods for analytical chemistry, and applying them to problems in chemical analysis.

He examined various problems in agricultural  chemistry, including the  composition  of  soils, the  value  of  marls  and  fossil  bones, and the growing of cotton.  As a result, he was selected by  Secretary James Buchanan to go to Turkey, in response to a request from the Sultan of Turkey for a scientific advisor on cultivating cotton. 
Between 1846 and 1850, Smith investigated the mineral resources of Turkey, for Turkey's government, and he discovered deposits of coal, chrome ore, and the famous emery deposits of Naxos.

In Turkey he discovered liebigite, naming it after Justus von Liebig.

Smith returned to the United States in 1850, and perfected the inverted microscope, an invention which he had begun working on while abroad.
He was apparently offered a professorship at the University  of  New  Orleans, but wrote in  December, 1850, that it "at  present  exists  but  in  name." Some of his papers from this period style him as professor of chemistry at the University of Louisiana (now Tulane University), New Orleans, Louisiana. By October 9, 1851, he was visiting Charleston.

On June 24, 1852, J. Lawrence Smith married Sarah Julia Guthrie, daughter of James Guthrie. In the autumn of 1852 he took up a professorship in the chair of chemistry at the University of Virginia, replacing Robert Empie Rogers, who moved to Philadelphia. This proved particularly productive for Smith's scientific research. His publications included a method for analyzing  the  alkaline  silicates, work he had begun in Paris. This was an important contribute to analytical methods.

As a result of his father-in-law's appointment as Secretary  of  the  Treasury in 1853, the couple moved to Washington, D.C. where Sarah served as a hostess for her father. Smith was able to do some work at the Smithsonian Institution and gave  lectures  for the  US Department of Agriculture, but had little opportunity for research.

James Guthrie had helped to found the University of Louisville, and in 1854 Smith took over a position there as chair and Professor of Medical Chemistry and Toxicology in the university's medical department. He replaced Benjamin Silliman Jr., who moved to Yale. Smith remained at Louisville from 1854 until 1866, resigning not long after the death of James Guthrie.

Smith was elected to the American Philosophical Society in 1857.

After 1866, he spent much of his time traveling in Europe, collecting, studying and writing about  "aerolites". His interest in meteorites predated his retirement from Louisville; his earliest paper on the subject was read  before  the  American Association for the Advancement of Science in  April,  1854. The  last  paper he published, in  the American Journal of Sciences,  1883, was "On the peculiar  concretions  in  meteoric iron."

Smith served as president of the American Association for the Advancement of Science (1872) and of the American Chemical Society (1877).

Smith purchased a collection of meteorites that had belonged to Gerard Troost of Nashville, Tennessee, and extended it by collecting specimens from all over the world. He attempted to obtain specimens from as many different meteoric falls as possible. His collection was estimated to contain specimens from about two hundred  and  fifty  falls,  with a combined weight  of around  twenty-five  hundred pounds,  He wished his collection to be kept together, and after his death it became the property of Harvard College.

References

External links

 
 

1818 births
1883 deaths
American chemists
American explorers
Physicians from South Carolina
University of Virginia alumni
Physicians from Louisville, Kentucky
Presidents of the American Chemical Society
Burials at Cave Hill Cemetery
19th-century American journalists
American male journalists
19th-century American male writers
University of Virginia faculty
Rare earth scientists